Samer Haj-Omar Wade (born 20 January 1992) is a former Mexican footballer who played as a forward.

References

1992 births
Living people
Mexican footballers
Association football forwards
Altamira F.C. players
Patriotas de Córdoba footballers
Albinegros de Orizaba footballers
Ascenso MX players
Liga Premier de México players
Tercera División de México players
Footballers from Veracruz
People from Veracruz (city)